Joseph Antonio Demers (July 22, 1917 – September 3, 1997) was a Canadian professional ice hockey forward who played 83 games in the National Hockey League for the Montreal Canadiens and New York Rangers. He was born in Chambly-Basin, Quebec. He started with the Canadiens in 1937-1938 but had to wait until the 1940-1941 season before playing a full season with the Montreal club. He only played 16 games in the two seasons that followed. In his last season with the Canadiens, he assisted on Maurice Richard's very first career goal.

In November 1949 he was convicted of manslaughter and sentenced to 15 years in prison. He had beaten a woman to death two months earlier at Coaticook, Quebec. He served his sentence and started his life again. He died in 1997 at the age of 80.

References

External links

1917 births
1997 deaths
Canadian expatriates in the United States
Canadian ice hockey forwards
Ice hockey people from Quebec
Montreal Canadiens players
New York Rangers players
People from Chambly, Quebec